New Year's Day – 1 January
Epiphany – 6 January
Clean Monday – date variable
Greek Independence Day – 25 March
Cyprus National Day – 1 April
Good Friday – date variable
Holy Saturday – date variable
Easter Sunday – date variable
Easter Monday – date variable
Easter Tuesday – date variable
Labour Day – 1 May
Pentecost Monday – date variable
Dormition of the Theotokos – 15 August
Cyprus Independence Day – 1 October
Greek National Day – 28 October
Christmas Eve – 24 December
Christmas Day – 25 December
Boxing Day – 26 December

Public transport
On public holidays, buses operate on a Sunday schedule.

References

External links
 Central Bank Of Cyprus - Working Hours & Bank Holidays
 Nicos Anastasiades pay tribute to EOKA liberation struggle

 
Cypriot culture
Society of Cyprus
Cyprus
Holidays